Perception Records was an American jazz/R&B record label.

What originally began as a production company in 1967 for pop and progressive rock acts, singer/songwriter/producer Jimmy Curtiss transitioned into Perception Ventures in 1969. Eventually expanding its roster to cater to other music genres, Perception's soul music output was released by both of its flagship labels, Perception Records and Today Records, the latter of which was run by Perception's executive vice-president, Patrick Adams.

Its parent label is Perception Ventures, Inc.

Discography

References

External links
Archive, Discogs

Jazz record labels